Nicole Gries-Trisse (born 29 June 1963) is a French politician of La République En Marche! (LREM) who served as a member of the French National Assembly from 2017 to 2022, representing the 5th constituency of the department of Moselle.

Political career
In parliament, Gries-Trisse served on the Committee on Foreign Affairs. 

In addition to her committee assignments, Gries-Trisse chaired the French delegation to the Parliamentary Assembly of the Council of Europe from 2017 to 2022. She also served on the Committee on Rules of Procedure, Immunities and Institutional Affairs and the Sub-Committee on Ethics. In 2019, she was the Assembly's rapporteur on the Council of Europe Development Bank (CEB).

In 2020, Trisse joined En commun (EC), a group within LREM led by Barbara Pompili.

Trisse lost her seat in the first round of the 2022 French legislative election.

Political positions
In April 2018, Gries-Trisse joined other co-signatories around Sébastien Nadot in officially filing a request for a commission of inquiry into the legality of French weapons sales to the Saudi-led coalition fighting in Yemen, days before an official visit of Saudi Crown Prince Mohammed bin Salman to Paris.

In July 2019, Gries-Trisse voted in favor of the French ratification of the European Union’s Comprehensive Economic and Trade Agreement (CETA) with Canada.

See also
 2017 French legislative election

References

1963 births
Living people
Deputies of the 15th National Assembly of the French Fifth Republic
La République En Marche! politicians
21st-century French women politicians
Place of birth missing (living people)
Women members of the National Assembly (France)